Tulia is a city in, and county seat of, Swisher County, Texas, United States. The population was 4,967 at the 2010 census; in the 2018 census estimate, it had fallen to 4,682. Tulia is a center for farming and agribusiness activities.

History
Its site was originally on the acreage of the Tule Ranch division of the JA Ranch. Evidently, the name Tule, after the nearby creek, had been selected for this post office, but at some point a clerk's error changed the name to Tulia. By 1900, Tulia was prospering as a stopping point for freight-wagon traffic en route to the railheads of Colorado City and Amarillo. A booming new era began with the extension of the Santa Fe line to Tulia in December 1906; with it came more settlers. In the mid-1980s, local industrial plants manufactured products such as clothing and farm implements, and four large cattle-feeding enterprises were nearby.

1999 drug arrest scandal
Tulia gained notoriety following a drug sting in July 1999 that rounded up 46 people, 39 of whom were innocent African Americans. The remaining detainees were Whites known to have ties within the Black community, and in fact lived in the "Black" part of town. Nearly one-third of Tulia's Black males were arrested, about 15% of the town's Black population. All charges were based on the word of undercover officer Tom Coleman, a so-called "gypsy cop" who made his living traveling through impoverished rural Texas offering to work undercover cheaply for short periods of time for underfunded police departments. Coleman claimed to have made over 100 drug buys in the small town. He never recorded any of the sales, but claimed to have written painstaking notes on his leg under his shorts and upper arm under his shirt sleeve when nobody was looking.

During the roundup, no large sums of money, illegal drugs, drug paraphernalia, nor illegal weapons were found. The accused drug dealers showed no signs of having any income associated with selling drugs. The drugs Coleman claimed to have bought from the accused did not have the fingerprints of the accused on them or their baggies. No independent witnesses could corroborate Coleman's claims. In his testimony, Coleman gave inaccurate descriptions of the "dealers" from whom he had allegedly bought cocaine. One suspect had his charges dropped when he was able to prove he had been at work during the times he had supposedly sold Coleman cocaine. Another produced bank and phone records indicating she was in Oklahoma City, Oklahoma, at the time of her alleged crime. Many of the accused, however, seeing the long sentences dealt by all-White juries in earlier cases, pled guilty in return for lighter sentences, despite their proclaimed innocence. The remaining defendants were convicted solely on the basis of Coleman's testimony. The Texas Department of Public Safety and Texas attorney general John Cornyn awarded "Lawman of the Year" to Coleman.

Amarillo civil rights attorney Jeff Blackburn began investigating the Tulia defendants' cases, along with civil rights organizations and a handful of attorneys from firms around the country. Eventually, the case became a cause célèbre, and money was raised to legally challenge the cases. Many had already served several years in prison before this process gained momentum. By 2004, Blackburn and his team had freed most of the "Tulia 46" and a $6,000,000 collective settlement was reached to avoid further litigation in civil court. Local authorities remain defiant, promising their town will not become a "slot machine" in the face of a new lawsuit stemming from an alleged incident of police brutality during the sweep.

In 2005, Coleman was convicted of perjury and sentenced to 10 years' probation and a $7,500 fine.

Federal laws titled after Tulia have twice been introduced in the United States Congress, but not enacted, to increase the evidentiary standard required to convict a person for a drug offense and to require screening of law enforcement officers or others acting under color of law participating in drug task forces.

Geography

Climate
According to the Köppen climate classification system, Tulia has a semiarid climate, BSk on climate maps.

Record low

Tulia holds the record for the lowest temperature in Texas, set during the Great Blizzard of 1899. The temperature was matched by Seminole, Texas, in 1933.

Demographics

2020 census

As of the 2020 United States census,  4,473 people, 1,548 households, and 947 families were residing in the city.

2000 census
As of the census of 2000, 5,117 people, 1,698 households, and 1,222 families resided in the city. The 1,898 housing units averaged . The racial makeup of the city was 66.45% White, 8.40% African American, 0.43% Native American, 0.10% Asian, 22.14% from other races, and 2.48% from two or more races. Hispanics or Latinos of any race were 39.63% of the population.

Of the 1,698 households, 37.0% had children under 18 living with them, 55.5% were married couples living together, 12.3% had a female householder with no husband present, and 28.0% were not families. About 25.8% of all households were made up of individuals, and 16.3% had someone living alone who was 65 or older. The average household size was 2.64, and the average family size was 3.18.

In the city, the population was distributed as 27.8% under 18, 11.9% from 18 to 24, 25.8% from 25 to 44, 18.7% from 45 to 64, and 15.8% who were 65 or older. The median age was 33 years. For every 100 females, there were 113.1 males. For every 100 females age 18 and over, there were 116.7 males.

The median income for a household in the city was $27,794, and for a family was $32,415. Males had a median income of $24,857 versus $20,000 for females. The per capita income for the city was $12,956. About 16.0% of families and 19.3% of the population were below the poverty line, including 26.7% of those under 18 and 14.9% of those 65 or over.

Politics
Tulia is represented in the U.S. House by Republican Ronny Jackson.

Education

The city is served by the Tulia Independent School District.

Schools that serve Tulia include:
Tulia High School (grades 9–12)
Tulia Junior High School (grades 6–8)
W.V. Swinburn Elementary School (grades 3–5)
Highland Elementary School (grades EE–2)

All of Swisher County is in the service area of Amarillo College.

Media
Newspapers
 Swisher County News

In media
A documentary Tulia, Texas: Scenes from the Drug War was filmed by Sarah Kunstler and Emily Kunstler in 2003, and won the Best Documentary Short award at Woodstock Film Festival.

Another documentary, titled Tulia, Texas, filmed by Cassandra Herman and Kelly Whalen, premiered in 2008 at the South by Southwest Film Festival in Austin and aired on PBS February 10, 2009.

The Tulia 46 drug sting event was featured the film Tulia, Texas, directed by John Singleton and starring Billy Bob Thornton and Halle Berry, and was scheduled for release in 2014. The 1999 drug arrests were also explored in the documentary American Drug War: The Last White Hope.

Rattlesnake is a 2019 crime drama mystery film set in Tulia.

Notable people

 Tim Curry, district attorney in Tarrant County, Texas, from 1972 to 2009
 Marshal Dutton, singer and guitarist for the band Hinder

References

External links

 City of Tulia
 
 Search the Tulia Herald from 1918-1956
 Tulia Independent School District
 
  (Documentary)

Cities in Swisher County, Texas
Cities in Texas
County seats in Texas